Grand Rapids Hornets were a franchise for one season (1950) in the National Professional Basketball League, based in Grand Rapids, Michigan.

History
The National Basketball Association contracted after the 1949–1950 season, losing six teams: The Anderson Packers, Sheboygan Red Skins and Waterloo Hawks jumped to the NPBL, while the Chicago Stags, Denver Nuggets and St. Louis Bombers folded. The league went from 17 teams to 11 before the 1950–1951 season started. Midway through the 1950–1951 season, the Washington Capitols folded as well, bringing the number of teams in the league down to ten.

The National Professional Basketball League was formed around the former NBA teams, with teams added in new larger markets. The charter teams were the East Division: Sheboygan Redskins (Former NBA), Anderson Packers (Former NBA), Louisville Alumnites and Grand Rapids Hornets. West Division: Denver Refiners/Evansville Agogans,  Saint Paul Lights, Kansas City Hi-Spots and Waterloo Hawks (Former NBA).

The Hornets competed in the Eastern Division of the NPBL. They compiled a record of 7 wins and 12 losses and finished in fourth place in the Eastern Division, behind the leading Sheboygan Redskins (at 29–16, .644). The Hornets were coached by future Naismith Hall of Fame inductee Bobby McDermott, George Glammack and Blackie Towery. On November 14, the Refiners played against Grand Rapids in Casper, Wyoming. After the game against Denver in Casper, McDermott was dismissed as Coach of Grand Rapids, due to his behavior during the game. It was stated in a complaint from the Chamber of Commerce, that McDermott's profanity could be heard all over the stadium by fans and officials and that he tore doors off lockers and shouted that his team had been "robbed." 

The Hornets actually folded before the season ended, a fate shared by the Louisville Alumnites, St. Paul Lights and Kansas City Hi-Spots, playing their last game on December 26, 1950.

After the demise of the Hornets, professional basketball did not return to Grand Rapids until the Grand Rapids Hoops of the Continental Basketball Association (1989–2003).

The NPBL permanently folded after the 1950–1951 Season.

The arena

The Hornets played at Civic Auditorium, which still exists today. With the "Civic Auditorium" front façade and lobby remaining intact, the auditorium portion was imploded in 2003, and in February 2005 was incorporated as a part of the Steelcase Ballroom of the DeVos Place Convention Center. The address of Civic Auditorium is 303 Monroe Avenue NW, Grand Rapids, Michigan.

Notable players 
 Russ DeVette
George Glamack
 Al Miksis
 Elmore Morgenthaler
 Bobby McDermott, player-coach; Naismith Basketball Hall of Fame inductee 
 Fritz Nagy
Ralph O'Brien
 Easy Parham

External links
 Extinct Sports Leagues site on the National Professional Basketball League
 Association for Professional Basketball Research site on the National Professional Basketball League

References

Defunct basketball teams in Michigan
Sports in Grand Rapids, Michigan
Basketball teams established in 1950
Basketball teams disestablished in 1950
National Professional Basketball League (1950–51)
1950 establishments in Michigan
1950 disestablishments in Michigan
Grand Rapids, Michigan
Sports teams in Michigan